Barbara Bedford may refer to:

* Barbara Bedford (actress) (1903–1981), American actress
 Barbara Bedford (swimmer) (born 1972), American former backstroke swimmer